William Kennedy (1853 – 24 August 1889) was a New Zealand cricketer. He played in five first-class matches for Wellington from 1877 to 1884.

See also
 List of Wellington representative cricketers

References

External links
 

1853 births
1889 deaths
New Zealand cricketers
Wellington cricketers
Place of birth missing